Paterson may refer to:

People
Paterson (surname)
Paterson (given name)

Places

Australia

Paterson, New South Wales
Paterson River, New South Wales
Division of Paterson, an electoral district in New South Wales
Paterson, Queensland, a locality in the Fraser Coast Region, Queensland
Electoral division of Paterson, an electoral district in Tasmania

United States
Paterson, New Jersey
Paterson, Washington

Elsewhere
Mount Paterson (Antarctica)
Mount Paterson, South Georgia
Paterson, Eastern Cape, South Africa
Paterson Inlet, New Zealand
Paterson Island, a sandspit off of Morrich More, Scotland
Paterson Street, Hong Kong

Other uses
Paterson (automobile), a car built by the W. A. Paterson Company from 1909-23
Paterson (film), a 2016 drama starring Adam Driver
Paterson (poem), by American poet William Carlos Williams
Colt Paterson, the first revolver

See also
 Patterson (disambiguation)
 Pattison (disambiguation)
 Petterson